000 Emergency, also known as Triple Zero or Triple 0, and sometimes stylised Triple Zero (000), is the primary national emergency telephone number in Australia.  The Emergency Call Service is operated by Telstra, and overseen by the Australian Communications and Media Authority (ACMA), and is intended only for use in life-threatening or time-critical emergencies.

Other emergency telephone numbers in Australia are 112 for GSM mobile and satellite phones, which is answered by a Triple Zero (000) operator, and 106 for telecommunications device for the deaf (TDD) textphones. Calls to the emergency telephone number can be made even if a mobile phone is locked, no SIM card is required, and calls must be forwarded by network service providers even if the subscriber is barred from making calls due to billing issues.

It is important to note that whilst dialling international emergency telephone number 112 from a mobile will connect to the Triple Zero operator, dialling 112 from a landline will not access the Triple Zero operator; 000 must be used from landlines.  Furthermore, the 911 emergency telephone number as used in North America will also not gain access to the Triple Zero operator, either from mobile or landline telephone.

For calls to the State Emergency Service (SES) about non–life-threatening situations, the Australia-wide telephone number 132 500 can be used. For non-emergency calls to the police in Australia, 131 444 should be used.

000 was also the emergency telephone number in Denmark and Finland until the introduction of the 112 number in 1993, and in Norway until 1986, when the emergency telephone numbers diverted to 001 for fire brigade, 002 for police and 003 for ambulance.  Those Norwegian emergency telephone numbers changed in 1994 to 110, 112 and 113 respectively.

History
Before 1969, Australia did not have a national telephone number for emergency services; the police, fire and ambulance services had many telephone numbers, one for each local unit.  In 1961, the office of the Postmaster General (PMG) starting introducing the 000 telephone number in major population centres, and during the  1960s, extended its coverage to nationwide.  The number 000 was chosen for several reasons: technically, it suited the dialling system for the most remote automatic exchanges, particularly outback Queensland.  These communities used the digit 0 to select an automatic trunk line to a centre.  In the most remote communities, two 0s had to be used to reach a main centre; thus dialling 0+0, plus another 0 would call (at least) an operator.  Zero is also the closest to the finger stall on  rotary dial phones making it easy to dial at night or in smoke.  It is now well established nationally throughout Australia that persons requiring emergency assistance dial 000.

Calling 000
Within Australia, 000 is a free call from most telephones.  Dialling 000 (or 112) on most Australian GSM mobile phones will override any keypad lock, and if the caller's home network is out of range, the phone will attempt to use other carriers' networks to relay the call.  A SIM card is not required to connect a mobile phone to the emergency numbers.  Interpreter services may be available once connected to emergency services.

Due to special configuration in their firmware, some 3G or GSM mobile phones sold in Australia will redirect other emergency telephone numbers, such as 911 and 999, to 000.  These calls are sent out by the handset as an emergency flag to the network, and as such, are treated in the same way as a call to 000.

Answering
Calling 000 greets the caller with a recorded message stating "You have dialled emergency Triple Zero, your call is being connected", then connects the caller to a Telstra operator who will then connect the caller to the emergency service organisation call taker.  Telstra operators will ask the caller which specific emergency service they require by saying: "Emergency.  Police, fire, or ambulance?", along with asking for their location if not calling from a phone with fixed location (landline).  The caller is then connected to the emergency service requested by the caller.

As soon as the emergency service call taker answers the call, any available caller location information, ascertained by automatically accessing a special database from the calling line identification (CLI) data that is provided with all emergency calls, is transferred to the emergency service; however, the emergency service call taker will still question the caller to obtain correct location details to dispatch the correct response.

The caller's address is usually available to Telstra operators for fixed services in Australia even if the number is "private".  However, emergency service organisation call takers will always ask for the address of the emergency to be stated whenever possible to ensure an accurate location is provided – this is especially relevant in the case of "third-party" callers who are not personally on the scene of the incident (e.g. relatives, or alarm monitoring corporations).  When calling from a telephone not at a fixed location (mobile), it is necessary for the caller to specify the location.

Victoria
In the state of Victoria, emergency service dispatch and call taking for Victoria Police, Ambulance Victoria, the Country Fire Authority, and the Fire Rescue Victoria, is handled by the Emergency Services Telecommunications Authority (ESTA).   ESTA operates three State Emergency Communications Centres, located in  Williams Landing, East Burwood, and Ballarat.

When a person calls 000 for emergency response within Victoria, the call will be answered by Telstra who determine the service required. The call is then directed to the relevant ESTA facility where it will be answered by the next available trained call taker, who will collect information from the caller, and enter this into the Computer Aided Dispatch (CAD) system.  Using this information, a dispatcher will identify and dispatch the appropriate emergency services or resources.  Emergency crews are often already being notified by the relevant services' dispatchers while the call taker is still obtaining further information or giving advice, such as guiding the caller through cardiopulmonary resuscitation (CPR), obtaining details of a possible offender, or receiving further details about the exact location or situation - an initial response may be made to details as vague as a town or suburb, while the call taker continues to get more specific location information.

ESTA is also responsible for Victorian State Emergency Service (SES) call-taking and dispatch, although this service cannot be contacted by dialling 000, as SES calls are not considered to be life-threatening.  The number for SES calls is 132 500, but police or another service dialled inappropriately will notify SES.

Many ESTA practices and protocols are standardised across all emergency services agencies, and all agencies use the same computer network.  The result is complete and instantaneous information sharing between emergency services.

Issues

2003 overload in Melbourne
On 3 December 2003, floods and storms in Melbourne, Victoria, caused "an extremely high number of calls to the 000 emergency call service", which prevented some calls from being answered immediately. This delay was compounded by a software upgrade on the emergency call handling system used by the Victorian emergency service organisations (ESOs), meaning that Telstra (the national 000 call operator) encountered severe delays in handing over emergency calls to the relevant ESO.  This caused some users interviewed by authorities to believe that they may have accidentally dialled the wrong number.  A subsequent investigation recommended that a temporary recorded announcement be implemented during extreme events to assure callers that their calls were being connected and a delay may occur.  This is not to be confused with the standard "You have dialled Emergency Triple Zero, your call is being connected" recorded voice announcement (RVA), which was introduced in 2008.

2009 Victorian bushfires
On 7 February 2009, catastrophic bushfires occurred in Victoria, otherwise known as Black Saturday bushfires.  Over 18,000 calls to the Triple Zero Emergency Service on that day were left unanswered, and the majority of calls took much longer to be answered than usual.  Owing to the unprecedented numbers of calls coming through, Telstra decided to isolate all Victorian emergency calls which were answered by the Melbourne emergency call centre, with all the remaining calls answered by the Sydney emergency call centre.  Telstra also activated the generic extreme event recorded voice announcement "You have dialled Emergency Triple Zero. If you require police, fire or ambulance, please stay on the line.  If you require your local State Emergency Service please hang up and dial 1223 – that's 1223 – as this service cannot be connected through Triple Zero", which temporarily replaced their front end announcement.  While Telstra records show 95 emergency call centre employees rostered during the 24-hour period on 7 February 2009, call pick up delays were evident due to lengthy delays at the SECC level, being ESTA.  Telstra agents were left tied up on phone calls with callers, waiting for emergency services to answer, thus calls in the 000 queue were unable to be answered.  Callers in a queue waiting for a Telstra agent to answer the phone were played an RVA every 30 seconds in the following terms, "You have dialled the Emergency Triple Zero number.  Due to an unprecedented high volume of calls being received by Triple Zero, we are experiencing short delays in answering.  Please stay on the line and you will be answered by the next available operator".  This reassures callers that an extreme emergency was occurring, and their call would be answered.

Nickname
Emergency services and Australia's communications regulator prefer the phrase "triple zero" over "triple oh" because of potential confusion and misunderstanding over keying the number when using alpha-numeric keypads, on which the letter 'O' is typically located on the same key as the number '6'.

Remote locations
One major obstacle in earlier 2009 is that operators of triple-0 could not use global positioning system (GPS) data within GSM or CDMA telephone systems to accurately locate distressed or injured persons using mobile phones visibly away from roads.  Instead, emergency operators must ask the caller exactly where they are.  The answer to this may need to correspond to an existing road name (which may be practically impossible for distressed person(s) some kilometres away from a road), until the emergency service organisation operator can dispatch an emergency service vehicle.  In 2010, the Australian Communications and Media Authority (ACMA) began researching options that may provide improved location information for mobile services when dialling 000.

In 2013, an emergency service smartphone app was produced and developed by Fire and Rescue NSW and the Triple Zero Awareness Working Group. Australians in remote locations are encouraged to use this app to contact emergency services, as it uses phones GPS data to display the caller's location on the screen.  This allows the caller to read their location aloud to the operator, so they can be found by emergency services when they are far from roads.

In 2017–2018, ACMA stated in their annual report that both Industry and Government had begun to make considerable investment to communications infrastructure.  This includes a privacy report for implementing the Advanced Mobile Location (AML) standard for Triple Zero calls. The system will automatically provide location data (including GPS, Wi-Fi positioning system, and mobile phone tracking) from the caller's device, to the Triple Zero operator automatically.  These new arrangements were due to be implemented and operating by May 2020.

Failures by 000 operators
The New South Wales State Labor Government has admitted to failings regarding the death of David Iredale, a high school student who died of dehydration in the bush near Katoomba, New South Wales, in late 2006.  Iredale called 000 several times for help before he died.  Emergency services, specifically the NSW Ambulance Service Triple Zero call centre, were accused of inappropriately handling Iredale's calls; he was not given any medical advice, and operators were accused of being "preoccupied" with obtaining a street address to send help to, although Iredale was in the bush.  An inquest set up to investigate failings in the 000 system as a result of his death identified serious issues in the practices used by 000 operators.

Another case of 000 operator failure was reported in The Daily Telegraph in 2011.  Joanna Wicking had called for police assistance, but the 000 operator chose to believe her killer, who had assured the operator everything was fine, despite repeated calls by Joanna.  In another incident six months later, when 000 staff were insistent about needing a street address for a remote country farm, the man needing help died.

Denial of access to 000
In April 2014, telecommunications company TPG was fined 400,000 for withholding access to emergency numbers where customers had failed to pay their bills.  Federal Court Justice Mordecai Bromberg found that TPG failed to provide access on over 190 occasions between March and September 2011, and the company did not ensure that almost 6000 lines had emergency access.

See also
106 Text Emergency Call — is the Australian national textphone/TTY emergency telephone number.
Police 101 — is the police single non-emergency telephone number in the United Kingdom (UK) which automatically connects the caller to their local police force (with the option to select a different police force if required), in a similar manner to the 999 emergency telephone number.
108 — is the emergency telephone number in India.
110 — is the emergency telephone number in China and Japan.
111 — is the emergency telephone number in New Zealand.
112, or one-one-two — is the emergency telephone number across the European Union (EU), United Kingdom (UK - where it works parallel to 999), and other non-EU countries, and on Global System for Mobile Communications (GSM) mobile telephone networks across the world.  Alternate emergency telephone number for tourists in Macau.
119 — is the emergency telephone number in Jamaica and parts of east and south Asia.  From May 2020, 119 was introduced in the United Kingdom as the single non-emergency number for the COVID-19 testing helpline in England, Wales, and Northern Ireland.
911, or nine-one-one — is the emergency telephone number in the United States, Canada, Mexico, and the Philippines.
999, or nine-nine-nine — is the common emergency telephone number used to contact one of the four main emergency control centres (ECC) in United Kingdom (where it works parallel to 112); also an emergency telephone number in several non-EU countries.  Former emergency telephone number in Ireland and Poland.
Emergency telephone
Emergency telephone number
In Case of Emergency (ICE) — is one (or more) entries in the contacts (phone book) on many mobile phones.[000]

References

External links
Australian Disaster Information Network: 000 – Australia's Emergency Call Service
Australian Communications and Media Authority: Emergency Calls Service Information 
Emergency Services Telecommunications Authority (VIC)

Telecommunications in Australia
Emergency telephone numbers
Three-digit telephone numbers